Dwight's Journal of Music (1852–1881, DJM) was an American music journal, one of the most respected and influential such periodicals in the country in the mid-19th century. John Sullivan Dwight created the Journal, and published it in Boston, Massachusetts. Among the early writers was Alexander Wheelock Thayer, who would become one of the first major music historians in the country. Other contributors have included John Knowles Paine, William F. Apthorp, W. S. B. Mathews and C. H. Brittan.

The Journal was eventually purchased by music publisher Oliver Ditson.

Publication details
The Journal was published weekly beginning on  Saturday, April 10, 1852, with each volume consisting of 26 numbers. Thus, the odd-numbered volumes ran from  April to near the end of September, and the even-numbered volumes, from early October to the end of March of the following year. In 1865 the journal was published biweekly and each volume ran for one complete year. In 1879, starting with Vol. XXXIX (39), the publication year began running from January to December. The last issue was Vol. XLI (41), No. 16 (September 3, 1881).

Online copies
Public domain scans of bound volumes from libraries are available online. Links are to copies at the Internet Archive (or in some cases Google Books). An index covering two volumes was issued with the final number for each even-numbered volume (or one volume for the biweekly volumes), and libraries typically bound all the issues for two volumes together with the index often, but not always, at the front of the relevant volume(s). (Some of the online copies are missing pages, or pages are out of sequence.)

 1852–1853 : Vols. I & II: copy1
 1853–1854 : Vols. III & IV:  copy1
 1854–1855 : Vols. V & VI: copy1 copy2
 1855–1856 : Vols. VII & VIII: copy1 copy2
 1856–1857 : Vols. IX & X: copy1 copy2
 1857–1858 : Vols. XI & XII: copy1
 1858–1859 : Vols. XIII & XIV: copy1
 1859–1860 : Vols. XV & XVI: copy1  copy2 (both at Google Books)
 1860–1861 : Vols. XVII & XVIII: copy1
 1861–1862 : Vols. XIX & XX: copy1
 1863–1864 : Vols. XXI & XXII: copy1
 1864–1865 : Vols. XXIII & XXIV: copy1
 1865–1867 : Vols. XXV (biweekly, 27 nos.) & XXVI (biweekly, 26 nos.): copy1
 1867–1869 : Vols. XXVII (biweekly) & XXVIII (biweekly): copy1 (at Google Books)
 1869–1871 : Vols. XXIX (biweekly) & XXX (biweekly): copy1
 1871–1873 : Vols. XXXI (biweekly) & XXXII (biweekly): copy1
 1873–1875 : Vols. XXXIII (biweekly) & XXXIV (biweekly): copy1
 1875–1877 : Vols. XXXV (biweekly) & XXXVI (biweekly): copy1
 1877–1878 : Vols. XXXVII (biweekly) & XXXVIII (biweekly, 19 nos., ending on Dec 21): copy1 copy2 copy3
 1879–1880 : Vols. XXXIX (biweekly, Jan–Dec 1879) & XL (biweekly, Jan–Dec 1880): copy1
 1881 : Vol. XLI (biweekly, 16 nos., ends on Sept 3, 1881, the last issue): copy1 copy2 (at Google Books)

References
Notes

Sources
 

1852 establishments in Massachusetts
1881 disestablishments in Massachusetts
Music magazines published in the United States
Weekly magazines published in the United States
Defunct magazines published in the United States
Magazines established in 1852
Magazines disestablished in 1881
Magazines published in Boston